Edita Daniūtė (born 1 July 1979 in Vilnius, Lithuania) is a professional Lithuanian ballroom dancer and television presenter.

Until 2007 she was competing with her partner Arūnas Bižokas as a couple; they won the World Games in 2005. In 2007 Bižokas transferred to the IOC non-recognized WDC and started representing the USA. After that Daniūtė started competing with Italian dancer and her husband Mirko Gozzoli under the Lithuanian flag. As a couple they become World and European champions. Edita Daniūtė was television presenter in the dance show "Šok su žvaigždė" that aired on LNK.

References 

1979 births
Living people
Lithuanian ballroom dancers
Lithuanian female dancers
Lithuanian television presenters
World Games gold medalists
World Games bronze medalists
Competitors at the 2001 World Games
Competitors at the 2005 World Games
Lithuanian women television presenters